Asterix and the Big Fight is a French comic book, the seventh in the Asterix comic book series. It was written by René Goscinny and illustrated by Albert Uderzo. Its original French title is Le Combat des chefs ("The Battle of the Chieftains") and it was first published in serial form in Pilote magazines, issues 261–302, in 1964. It was translated into English in 1971.

Plot summary
The Romans having been humiliated many times by the rebel Gauls, Felonius Caucus, advisor to Centurion Nebulus Nimbus, suggests a single combat between Vitalstatistix, chief of Asterix's tribe, and the Gallo-Roman Chief, Cassius Ceramix of Linoleum. According to ancient Gaulish customs, the loser would forfeit his entire tribe to the winner. When Ceramix argues that Vitalstatistix would surely win with Getafix's magic potion of invincibility, Caucus sends a patrol to capture Getafix before the challenge is confirmed. Whilst attempting to scatter the attackers, Obelix accidentally strikes Getafix with a menhir, the impact of which causes amnesia and insanity.

Following Cassius Ceramix's challenge, Asterix and Vitalstatistix attempt to restore Getafix's mind by experimenting in potions; but this produces only a whimsical sub-plot, in which the Roman soldier Infirmofpurpus, captured by Obelix as a test subject, is temporarily rendered weightless. Thereafter Asterix and Obelix consult Psychoanalytix (original French name is Amnesix), a druid who specializes in mental disorders; but when asked to demonstrate what caused the problem, Obelix crushes Psychoanalytix with a menhir, leaving him "in the same state as Getafix". As the two crazed druids concoct a number of skin-coloring potions, Asterix tries to get Vitalstatistix into good physical shape for the fight, mainly by jogging. Meanwhile, the Romans plan to arrest Ceramix after the fight, lest he thereafter challenge their control of Gaul.

As the fight begins, Getafix accidentally makes a potion which restores his mind, and retains sanity despite being hit by another menhir (thrown by Obelix in an attempt to cure Getafix by repeating the cause of the original accident). Getafix quickly proceeds to brew a supply of magic potion. Meanwhile, the fight has turned into a bore: Vitalstatistix, exploiting his superior physical condition, is running circles around the ring while Ceramix tries in vain to catch him. After hearing of Getafix's recovery, Vitalstatistix defeats his exhausted opponent with a single blow. The Romans do not accept this victory, but are crushed by the Gauls, who had drunk Getafix's magic potion. When Ceramix is reduced to amnesia by a third menhir that was thrown by Obelix during the battle, Vitalstatistix declines his right to take over Ceramix's tribe, and sends him home in honour. Psychoanalytix returns to business despite his amnesia, but remains professionally successful despite "side effects" of his medicines. Ceramix, now in the same mental state as Psychoanalytix, becomes "the most courteous chief in Gaul" and the probable originator of French courtesy. His tribe returns to Gaulish ways and the fight against Rome, while Vitalstatistix's tribe celebrate their victories.

Notes
In issue #260 of Pilote, which preceded the publication of the actual story, Vitalstatistix was depicted hosting a press conference to announce that Asterix and the Big Fight would be the next adventure and that he would play a leading role in it. This scene was reprinted in Asterix and the Class Act (2003) as its introduction.
In the original French version, Vitalstatistix's opponent is called Aplusbégalix ("A plus B equals X"). In the English translation, his name of Cassius Ceramix is a reference to the boxer Muhammad Ali, formerly known as Cassius Clay, who was world heavyweight champion when the story was written. Vitalstatistix's strategy of wearing down his opponent ('rope-a-dope') and his victory dance (the Ali shuffle) is a parody of Ali's style.
When a Roman envoy is sent to inform Ceramix that "Getafix has been disposed of", he is told that Ceramix is "inspecting Professor Berlix's school for modern languages": a play on Maximilian Berlitz and his International Language Schools.
In the scene in which an amusement park is set up, one ride is called the 'Slavic Mountain'. This is a pun on the French name for roller coaster, "Russian mountain". A book store called "W. H. Smix" can be seen in the same scene, which is a pun on the chain W. H. Smith. In the same panel is a tent with a sign: "Menagerix — See The Fabulous Animals"; and a billboard outside of this tent has a picture of the Marsupilami, a famous Belgian comics character.
Where Psychoanalytix's nurse introduces the conditions of his patients to Asterix and Obelix, one appears to believe he is Napoléon Bonaparte, which mystifies everyone as the story is set in 50 BC.
In this album Vitalstatistix's (as yet unnamed) wife appears for the first time, fussing over him when he is preparing to meet Cassius Ceramix.
The "menhiring" subplot was reintroduced three decades later in Asterix and the Actress.

Film adaptation
An animated film bearing the comic's title was released in 1989. However, the plot is in fact closer to Asterix and the Soothsayer; only the subplot involving Getafix's amnesia is retained from the Big Fight.

Reception 
On Goodreads, it has a score of 4.14 out of 5.

References

External links 

On archive.org

Big Fight, Asterix and the
Works originally published in Pilote
Literature first published in serial form
1966 graphic novels
Works by René Goscinny
Comics by Albert Uderzo
Gallo-Roman culture